Theodore C. Link, FAIA, (March 17, 1850 – November 12, 1923) was a German-born American architect and newspaper publisher. He designed buildings for the 1904 World's Fair, Louisiana State University, and the Mississippi State Capitol.

Early life 
Theodore Carl Link was born on March 17, 1850, near Heidelberg, Germany. He was trained in engineering at the University of Heidelberg and the École Centrale Paris.

Career 

Link emigrated to the United States, arriving in St. Louis in 1873 to work for the Atlantic and Pacific Railroad company. He married Annie Fuller on September 22, 1875. That year, St. Louis Surveyor Julius Pitzman recommended him to the job of superintendent of public parks for St. Louis. In 1889, Link joined the American Institute of Architects and started his own private architectural practice.

After a four-year interim as a German-language newspaper publisher in Pittsburgh, Pennsylvania, Link returned to St. Louis just after the turn of the century as one of the architects for the 1904 World's Fair. In 1901 he won the competition to design the new Mississippi State Capitol building in Jackson, which was completed two years later. He also "designed most of the buildings for LSU when the campus was relocated in the 1920s."

Death and legacy 
Link died in Baton Rouge while working on the new Louisiana State University campus, and was interred at Bellefontaine Cemetery in St. Louis. In 1995 was awarded a star on the St. Louis Walk of Fame.

His best known work is in the Richardsonian Romanesque style, specifically the St. Louis Union Station (1894), and the Second Presbyterian Church (1899). The Theodore Link Historic Buildings (c. 1911) in University City are three private residences on Delmar Boulevard that are listed on the National Register of Historic Places listings in St. Louis County, Missouri.

Work 
Among the 100+ buildings he designed:
 1869 Monticello Seminary (now Lewis and Clark Community College), Godfrey, Illinois
 1891 gates and several houses for two of St. Louis's private places, Westmoreland Place and Portland Place
 1894 St. Louis Union Station, modeled on the fortifications of Carcassonne, with architect Edward Cameron
 1899 Second Presbyterian Church, 4501 Westminster Place, St. Louis
 1901 St. John's United Methodist Church, 5000 Washington Place
 1901 Wabash Railroad Station and Railway Express Agency, 780 East Cerro Gordo Street, Decatur, Illinois
 1902 Wabash Railroad Station, Danville, Illinois
 1903 Wabash Pittsburgh Terminal, Liberty Avenue at Ferry Street, Pittsburgh, Pennsylvania 
 1903 Mississippi State Capitol, Jackson, Mississippi
 1904 Palace of Mines and Metallurgy at the 1904 World's Fair (razed)
 1904 Reid Hall and campus master plan for Washington and Lee University
 1906 Barr Branch, St. Louis Public Library
 1910 Roberts Shoe (International Shoe) Company Building, St. Louis, with ornament influenced by Louis Sullivan
 1911 Theodore Link Historic Buildings, 7100, 7104 and 7108 Delmar Blvd, University City, Missouri
 1919–1923, master plan and nine buildings for the Louisiana State University, including the Memorial Tower, with W. T. Trueblood

Images

References

External links 

 
 Online photo and biography
 Theodore C. Link Zoological Gardens Sketchbook in Digital Collections at the St. Louis Public Library
 Louisiana State University Architectural Drawings by Theodore Link, Louisiana Digital Library, Baton Rouge, La.
Theodore C. Link Collection finding aid at the St. Louis Public Library

1850 births
1923 deaths
German emigrants to the United States
Architects from St. Louis
19th-century American architects
Fellows of the American Institute of Architects
Heidelberg University alumni
People from Baden-Württemberg
Burials at Bellefontaine Cemetery
American railway architects
20th-century American architects